Asley is both a surname and a given name. Notable people with the name include:

Yasha Asley (born 2002), British mathematics child prodigy
Asley González (born 1989), Cuban judoka

See also
Ashley (given name)
Ashley (surname)
Astley (name)